James Ernest Bryan (January 28, 1926 – June 19, 1960) was an American racecar driver who won the 1958 Indianapolis 500. Born in Phoenix, Arizona, Bryan died as a result of injuries sustained in a champ car race at Langhorne Speedway.

Career
He drove in the AAA and USAC Championship Car series, racing in the 1952–1960 seasons with 72 starts, including each year's Indianapolis 500 race.  He finished in the top ten 54 times, with 23 victories.

Bryan won the 1958 Indianapolis 500 and the 1954 AAA and 1956 and 1957 USAC National Championship.  During his 1957 championship season, Bryan also won the inaugural running of the Race of Two Worlds at Autodromo Nazionale Monza, Italy.

Death and legacy
Bryan died after a crash in a Champ car race at Langhorne Speedway in 1960, on the same day that two drivers were killed in the Belgian Grand Prix, making the day one of the most tragic in racing history. For many years one of the two championship races at the Phoenix International Raceway was a memorial race dedicated to Bryan. He was also memorialized in a song by Harry Weger titled "The Ballad of Jimmy Bryan". Bryan is buried in Phoenix's Greenwood/Memory Lawn Mortuary & Cemetery.

Awards

He was inducted in the National Sprint Car Hall of Fame in 1994.
He was inducted in the Motorsports Hall of Fame of America in 1999.
He was inducted in the International Motorsports Hall of Fame in 2001.

Complete Open Wheel Championship Car results

Indianapolis 500 results

Complete Formula One World Championship results
(key)

See also

Race of Two Worlds
1958 Indianapolis 500

References

External links 
Grand Prix History , Jimmy Bryan
AAA and USAC Championship Car Statistics - Jimmy Bryan

1926 births
1960 deaths
AAA Championship Car drivers
Champ Car champions
Champ Car drivers
Indianapolis 500 drivers
Indianapolis 500 winners
International Motorsports Hall of Fame inductees
National Sprint Car Hall of Fame inductees
Racing drivers who died while racing
Sports deaths in Pennsylvania
Racing drivers from Phoenix, Arizona
Formula One race winners
USAC Stock Car drivers